Ruben Ewald Ligeon (born 24 May 1992) is a Dutch professional footballer who last played as a right back for NAC Breda. Before moving to Slovakia where he featured for Slovan Bratislava and AS Trenčín, he played for Ajax Amsterdam, NAC Breda, Willem II and Utrecht in the Netherlands.

Club career

Ajax
Ligeon played for De Meteoor and OSV in his early career before joining the youth ranks of Ajax. He made his debut for the first team in a home draw against AZ on 15 October 2011, replacing André Ooijer in the 45th minute. He scored his first goal in the 41st minute of an 8–0 pre-season friendly match win over Noordwijk on 16 July 2012. He scored his second goal in a pre-season friendly encounter the next season against Waalwijk on 13 July 2013, scoring the fourth goal just before half-time in the 5–1 win. On 18 August 2013, Ligeon started in his first ever Klassieker match against arch-rivals Feyenoord, when he replaced the suspended Ricardo van Rhijn in the starting line-up. His cross in the 37th minute led to Kolbeinn Sigþórsson's header and his second goal in the 2–1 home win.

NAC Breda
On 27 January 2015, it was announced that Ligeon would spend the rest of the season on loan with NAC Breda.

Willem II
On 22 June 2015, it was announced that Ligeon was sent on loan at Willem II, together with Lesly de Sa and Richairo Zivkovic.

Slovan Bratislava
Ligeon left Slovan Bratislava on 31 August 2017. Ligeon then trained with the Danish Superliga-club AGF in December 2017.

PEC Zwolle
On 16 January 2018, Ligeon signed a contract for 2.5 years with Eredivisie side PEC Zwolle.

AS Trenčín 
On 6 July 2019, Ligeon moved to Slovak side AS Trenčín on a free transfer.

Return to NAC Breda
Ligeon returned to NAC on 22 August 2021, signing a two-year contract.

Ligeon's contract with NAC was terminated by mutual consent on 19 March 2023.

Personal life
Born in the Netherlands, Ligeon is of Surinamese descent. He is a younger brother of American international player Maurice Ligeon.

Career statistics

Club

Honours
Ajax
 Eredivisie: 2011–12, 2012–13, 2013–14
 Eusébio Cup: 2014

References

External links
 
 Netherlands stats at OnsOranje
 Netherlands U21 stats at OnsOranje
 

1992 births
Living people
Association football fullbacks
Footballers from Amsterdam
Dutch footballers
Dutch expatriate footballers
Netherlands youth international footballers
Netherlands under-21 international footballers
Dutch sportspeople of Surinamese descent
AFC Ajax players
Jong Ajax players
NAC Breda players
Willem II (football club) players
FC Utrecht players
ŠK Slovan Bratislava players
PEC Zwolle players
De Graafschap players
AS Trenčín players
Eredivisie players
Eerste Divisie players
Slovak Super Liga players
Dutch expatriate sportspeople in Slovakia
Expatriate footballers in Slovakia